Quesnelia quesneliana is a species of bromeliad in the genus Quesnelia.

This species is endemic to the Atlantic Forest ecoregion of southeastern Brazil.

References

quesneliana
Endemic flora of Brazil
Flora of the Atlantic Forest
Flora of Espírito Santo
Flora of Minas Gerais
Flora of Rio de Janeiro (state)
Taxa named by Adolphe-Théodore Brongniart
Taxa named by Lyman Bradford Smith